Marcelo Alberto Barovero (born 18 February 1984) is an Argentine professional footballer who plays as a goalkeeper for Liga MX club Atlético San Luis. He often goes by the nickname of "Trapito" (Spanish for "Little Rag").

Career

Early years 

His first steps in the practice of football were at the club of his hometown, Porteña Asociación Cultural y Deportiva, then he played at the youth academy of Atlético Rafaela until his professional debut.

Professional career

Atlético Rafaela 
Barovero started his professional career in 2003 playing for Atlético de Rafaela in the Primera B Nacional (Argentine second division). In his first season, the club won the championship and promotion to the Primera División. Barovero was used as the club's third choice goalkeeper in the first division, behind Ángel David Comizzo and Ezequiel Medrán. Rafaela was relegated at the end of the 2003–04 season, but Barovero stayed with the club and established himself as the first choice goalkeeper back in the B Nacional. He totalled 113 appearances for Atlético de Rafaela, before his move to Huracán (of the first division) in 2007.

Huracán 
In the 2007/2008 season, he played all the 38 matches that his team disputed. At the end of this season, he was bought by Vélez Sársfield.

Velez Sarsfield 
In 2008, after one season as a starter in Huracán, Barovero was bought by Vélez Sársfield to compete with Germán Montoya for the position of first choice goalkeeper. During the 2009 Clausura he was part of the Vélez team that won the championship, being an unused substitute during the tournament.

He eventually caught his break during the 2010 Apertura, during which he started in all but three games of his team's runner-up campaign. He finished the tournament with only 6 goals conceded in 16 games, and kept a clean sheet in 12 of the games. At the end of the tournament, he was awarded the Ubaldo Matildo Fillol Award for being the goalkeeper with the lowest goals-to-games ratio. The following semester, Barovero started in all 19 games of Vélez 2011 Clausura winning campaign, and all 12 of the team's Copa Libertadores semifinalist campaign.

River Plate 
After his successful spell in Velez, in the 2012 Argentine winter transfer window giant River Plate picked him up for a US$250,000 season-long loan. He soon became the undisputed starting goalkeeper during his first semester at the club, and upon completion of the loan, River made his move permanent for a reported fee of US$950,000. Since then he's been one of the stars of the Argentine side and was named Man of the Match in more than one occasion, but most notably on an intense fixture in the 2013 Copa Sudamericana against Buenos Aires rivals San Lorenzo to advance to the Round of Sixteen. He won multiple titles with the squad, most notably the 2015 Copa Libertadores. The fans consider him an idol of the team.

Club Necaxa 
Marcelo Barovero was officially transferred from River Plate to Necaxa of Liga MX, on 9 July 2016.

C.F. Monterrey 
Monterrey football club unveiled May 23, 2018, the signing of Barovero, through the club's Twitter account. Barovero arrived for the 2018 Apertura MX tournament as one of the first reinforcements of the team led by Diego Alonso. The Argentine came from spending two years with Necaxa, where he won the Copa MX at the Clausura 2018.

Atlético San Luis

Barovero was unveiled in 2021.

Career statistics

Club

Honours

Atlético Rafaela
Primera B Nacional: 2002–03

Vélez Sársfield
Argentine Primera División: 2009 Clausura, 2011 Clausura

River Plate
Argentine Primera División: 2014 Final
Copa Campeonato: 2013–14
Copa Libertadores: 2015
Copa Sudamericana: 2014
Recopa Sudamericana: 2015
Suruga Bank Championship: 2015

Necaxa
Copa MX: Clausura 2018

Monterrey
Liga MX: Apertura 2019
CONCACAF Champions League: 2019

Individual
Ubaldo Fillol Award : 2010 Apertura, 2011 Clausura, 2013 Inicial, 2014 Primera División
Copa Sudamericana Best Player: 2014
Liga MX Golden Glove: 2017–18
CONCACAF Champions League Golden Glove: 2019
CONCACAF Champions League Team of the Tournament: 2019

References

External links
 Profile at Vélez Sársfield's official website 
 Argentine Primera statistics at Fútbol XXI  
 Statistics at Irish Times

1984 births
Living people
Sportspeople from Córdoba Province, Argentina
Argentine footballers
Argentine expatriate footballers
Association football goalkeepers
Argentine Primera División players
Liga MX players
Atlético de Rafaela footballers
Club Atlético Huracán footballers
Club Atlético Vélez Sarsfield footballers
Club Atlético River Plate footballers
Club Necaxa footballers
Atlético San Luis footballers
Expatriate footballers in Mexico